The Monnet Authority was the first High Authority of the European Coal and Steel Community (ECSC), between 1952 and 1955. Its president was Jean Monnet of France.

Monnet resigned on Europe day 1955 following the failure of the European Defence Community and was succeeded by the Mayer Authority. There were four more High Authorities before the institutions of the ECSC were merged with those of the European Atomic Energy Community and the European Economic Community in 1967 to become the European Communities.

Membership
The High Authority was based temporarily in Luxembourg City and consisted of nine members; one each for the Benelux states, two for the larger states of France, Germany and Italy. Nevertheless, the Monnet Authority had two members from Belgium and one from Italy. The members were supposed to represent the general interest of the Community and were assisted by a consultative committee. Each member was involved in a number of areas, working with other members, and led one or two of those areas.

In addition to Jean Monnet of France, as president, the authority comprised:

 Franz Etzel of Germany, First Vice-President
 Markets, agreements, transport (President)
 Social problems
 External relations
 Press and information
 'Messina' working group
 Albert Coppé of Belgium, Second Vice-President
 Long term policy (President)
 Markets, agreements, transport
 Press and information
 'Messina' working group
 Paul Finet of Belgium
  Problems (President)
 Administrative questions (President)
 Dirk Spierenburg of Netherlands
 External relations (President)
 Markets, agreements, transport
 'Messina' working group
 Léon Daum of France
 Finance, investment, production (President)
 Instructions group (President)
 Long-term policy
 Markets, agreements, transport
 Press and information
 Enzo Giacchero of Italy
 Press and information (President)
 Long-term policy
 Finance, investment, production
 Administrative questions
 Instructions group
 Albert Wehrer of Luxembourg
 Finance, investment, production
 Social Problems
 External relations
 Administrative questions
 Instructions group
 Heinz Potthof of Germany 
 Long-term policy
 Finance, investment, production
 Administrative questions
 Instructions group

See also
 History of the European Union
History of the European Commission

References

External links
 President Monnet on the opening of the common market. Recorded speech (00:00:19). Available on CVCE website - Centre virtuel de la connaissance sur l'Europe
 ECSC activities between 1952 and 1957 CVCE - Centre virtuel de la connaissance sur l'Europe

High Authorities of the European Coal and Steel Community
1952 establishments in Europe
1955 disestablishments in Europe
Jean Monnet